The Preneuse class was a type of two 44-gun frigates of the French Navy, designed by Raymond-Antoine Haran and built at Rochefort, Charente-Maritime.

 Preneuse
Builder: Rochefort Dockyard
Ordered: 24 April 1794
Begun: April 1794
Launched: 16 February 1795
Completed: July 1795
Fate: Ran aground 11 December 1799 on the Île de France (Mauritius) to avoid attack by British warships, which then burnt her.

 Africaine
Builder: Rochefort Dockyard
Ordered: 1795
Begun: March 1795
Launched: 3 January 1798
Completed: May 1798
Fate: Captured 19 February 1801 by HMS Phoebe east of Gibraltar. Recaptured 13 September 1810 by the French but immediately retaken bu HMS Boadicea. Taken to pieces in September 1816.

References
 
 
 
 

 
Frigate classes
Ship classes of the French Navy